Wheels O' Time Museum is a museum in Dunlap, Illinois, United States.

Its exhibits include Rock Island 886, a 4-6-2 Pacific type steam locomotive built in 1910 by the American Locomotive Company for the Rock Island Railroad and two old railroad passenger cars. A giant Lego exhibit will open in May 2022, donated by the family of the man who built it. A LeTourneau Metal House, an example of prefabricated housing built during the Great Depression, is also on display. The collection includes many antique cars.

References

External links

Museums in Peoria County, Illinois